The name Kirk has been used for three tropical cyclones worldwide.

In the Atlantic Ocean: 
 Hurricane Kirk (2012), never threatened land.
Tropical Storm Kirk (2018), a low latitude storm; affecting Lesser Antilles.

In the Western Pacific Ocean:
 Typhoon Kirk (1996) (T9610, 13W, Isang), struck southwestern Japan.

Atlantic hurricane set index articles
Pacific typhoon set index articles